Soulari is a village in the municipal unit Falaisia, Arcadia, Greece. It is situated 3 km north of Falaisia, 3 km southwest of Voutsaras, 3 km southeast of Leontari and 11 km southeast of Megalopoli. In 2011 Soulari had a population of 83. The name Soulari comes from the Turkish word "sular" meaning waters. The village is located near the Kefalovryso and Kolokytha springs.

Population

See also
List of settlements in Arcadia

References

External links
History and information about Soulari
Soulari GTP Travel Pages

Falaisia
Populated places in Arcadia, Peloponnese